The SIA.9 was an Italian reconnaissance-bomber built by Società Italiana Aviazione, a division of Fiat.

Development
The 9B began as the SIA.7B2 fitted with a much larger engine, the  Fiat A.14. The larger engine increased the aircraft's speed, but also its weight, resulting in only an overall slight increase in maximum speed.

The Italian Navy ordered 200, and received 62 by the end of World War I.

Fiat dropped its SIA name, and manufactured another 129 aircraft under the designation Fiat R.2. These aircraft served until 1925.

Operators

Regia Marina

Specifications

References

1910s Italian military reconnaissance aircraft
Military aircraft of World War I
Single-engined tractor aircraft
Biplanes
Aircraft first flown in 1918